Allium negevense is a plant species found in Israel and Palestine. It is a small plant adapted to life in the Negev Desert. It umbel contains only a few white flowers.

References

negevense
Onions
Flora of Israel
Flora of Palestine (region)
Plants described in 1969